The Merchant Shipping (Homosexual Conduct) Act 2017 (c. 26) is an act of the Parliament of the United Kingdom. The act repealed parts of the Criminal Justice and Public Order Act 1994 that allowed homosexual acts to be grounds for dismissal from the crew of merchant ships. It was introduced to Parliament as a private members bill by John Glen and Baroness Scott of Bybook.

Provisions
The provisions of the act are:

The repeal of sections 146(4) and 147(3) of the Criminal Justice and Public Order Act 1994 which allowed conduct deemed homosexual as grounds for dismissal from the crew of a merchant ship.

Timetable

Through the Commons
The Bill had its first reading in the House of Commons on 29 June 2016 and its second reading on 20 January 2017. The committee stage started on 8 February and the committee reported on 24 March. The Bill passed its third reading the same day with no amendments.

Through the Lords and royal assent
The Bill had its first reading on 27 March 2017 and its second reading on 6 April. The order of commitment was discharged and so the Bill had no committee stage in the Lords. The Bill passed its third reading on 27 of April and gained royal assent the same day.

Amendments
As of June 2019, there have been no amendments to the Act.

References

United Kingdom Acts of Parliament 2017
LGBT law in the United Kingdom
LGBT rights in the United Kingdom
2017 in British law
2017 in LGBT history